The Summit tram stop is a tram terminus situated on the Great Orme Tramway at the summit of the Great Orme in Llandudno, Wales. The Great Orme Tramway is a funicular, which connects the summit with a lower terminus at Victoria in the centre of Llandudno. From the summit station, access is available to the Great Orme Country Park Visitor Centre, the Summit Complex and cafe, a large outdoor playground, and the many walks on the Orme.

Trams run approximately every ten minutes to the Summit station, decreasing to every twenty minutes in off-peak times or during windy weather. Trams run seasonally only, from late March to late October.

References

Great Orme Tramway
Railway stations in Conwy County Borough